Bruce Liu (born Xiaoyu Liu on May 8, 1997) is a Canadian pianist. Born in Paris and raised in Montreal, he began to play the piano at eight years old and was performing by the age of eleven. In 2021, he rose to widespread renown after winning the XVIII International Chopin Piano Competition.

Early life and education
Liu was born in Paris to Chinese parents from Beijing. When he was six, he moved to Montreal with his father. He initially started piano studies on an electric keyboard but progressed to an upright once he became more serious. He graduated from the Montreal Conservatory of Music in the piano class of Richard Raymond. He has since been studying with Đặng Thái Sơn at the Université de Montréal.

Career

2012-2021: Early career  
At the age of fifteen, Liu performed with the Cleveland Orchestra and Jahja Ling at Severance Hall. In the following years, he also collaborated with many leading ensembles such as the Israel Philharmonic Orchestra, Orchestre Symphonique de Montréal and the Orchestra of the Americas. He also toured North America with the NCPA Orchestra, and twice in China with the National Symphony Orchestra of Ukraine and the Lviv National Philharmonic respectively. 

In 2012, Liu won the Grand Prize at the Orchestre Symphonique de Montréal Standard Life Competition. Recipient of the 2015 Prix d’Europe, he was awarded major prizes at the Thomas & Evon Cooper International Competition in 2012 and the Sendai International Music Competition in 2016. He was also a finalist of the Montreal International Music Competition and the Arthur Rubinstein International Piano Master Competition in Tel Aviv.

2021-present: Breakthrough and debut album 
 In 2021, Liu was named the winner of the XVIII International Chopin Piano Competition in Warsaw. He scored the highest marks in the first three stages and was the only competitor to be unanimously selected by the jury to progress from each round. He was also the clear audience favourite and received a prolonged standing ovation for his final round performance of Chopin’s Piano Concerto No. 1 with the Warsaw Philharmonic Orchestra under Andrey Boreyko.

Shortly after his success in Warsaw, Liu embarked on a world tour which included performances with the NHK Symphony Orchestra, Seoul Philharmonic Orchestra, Polish National Radio Symphony Orchestra, Orchestre Philharmonique du Luxembourg, NFM Wrocław Philharmonic and the Orquestra Sinfônica Brasileira. In recital, he appeared at the Théâtre des Champs-Elysées in Paris, Wiener Konzerthaus, BOZAR in Brussels, Philharmonie Luxembourg, Tokyo Opera City Concert Hall, Sala São Paulo and The Orpheum in Vancouver. Replacing Nobuyuki Tsujii, he made his London debut performing Tchaikovsky’s Piano Concerto No. 2 with the Philharmonia Orchestra at Royal Festival Hall. He also returned to the National Philharmonic in Warsaw on Frédéric Chopin’s birthdate for two sold-out recitals, which he dedicated to the victims of the armed conflict in Ukraine.

On World Piano Day in 2022, Liu signed an exclusive contract with Deutsche Grammophon. Months prior, the label released a live album of his winning performances from the International Chopin Piano Competition. The album was critically acclaimed and received praise from publications such as BBC Music Magazine and Gramophone. For the latter, it was included in its list of best classical albums from 2021 and was described as “one of the most distinguished Chopin recitals of recent years, full of maturity, character and purpose.”

Personal life 
Liu can speak fluent French, English and Mandarin.

Discography

Awards 
 2012: Thomas & Evon Cooper International Competition - Second Prize
 2012: Orchestre Symphonique de Montréal Standard Life Competition - Grand Prize
 2015: Prix d’Europe - Winner
 2016: Sendai International Music Competition - Fourth Prize and Audience Prize
 2021: International Chopin Piano Competition - First Prize

References

External links 
 Official website
Bruce Liu - Liu Kotow International Management & Promotion

1997 births
Living people
21st-century Canadian pianists
Canadian classical pianists
International Chopin Piano Competition winners
21st-century classical pianists
Music & Arts artists
Canadian musicians of Chinese descent
Canadian male pianists